Opinion polls played an important role in the runup to the Kenyan elections of December 2007. A number of institutes published results on the presidential candidates. Nation Media employed the Kenyan Steadman market information company to conduct regular polls, which thus received the widest attention.

Polls are a new instrument on the Kenyan political scene. Recent elections had seen some results published which met, however, with widespread scepticism.

The publication of polls in 2007 generated large interest and controversy as they were alternatively welcomed or condemned by parties and observers on the national scene and frequently criticised as having been manipulated by one or the other side.

Generally polls showed in early stages a lead for President Mwai Kibaki and a strong showing of Kalonzo Musyoka on the opposition side.

After realignments in the opposition Raila Odinga had managed to get the support of regional leaders from a multi-tribal background and Musyoka looked largely reduced to his Kamba hometurf. This showed in the polls with Odinga surging ahead.

After re-formation on the president's side criticism at Odinga became more pointed and this message seems to have had effect in narrowing the difference between the leading presidential contestants.

National polls

Regional polls

23 September 2007

29 September 2007

23 October 2007

23 November 2007

7 December 2007

References

2007 Kenyan elections
Kenya